Homalium hypolasium is a species of plant in the family Salicaceae. It is found in Cameroon and Equatorial Guinea. Its natural habitat is subtropical or tropical moist lowland forests. It is threatened by habitat loss.

References

hypolasium
Endangered plants
Taxonomy articles created by Polbot